Samuel Marques (born Condom, 8 December 1988) is a French-Portuguese rugby union player. He plays as a scrum-half. He is of Portuguese descent and represents Portugal at international level.

Club career
Marques first played at US Eauze, from 2004/05 to 2006/07, before joining Section Paloise in 2007/08. He joined the first team at 2009/10, and would play there until 2011/12, at the Pro D2. He was lent to SC Albi for two seasons, 2011/12 to 2013/14, playing regularly at the Pro D2. He returned to Section Paloise, playing two seasons and being a member of the team that won the Pro D2 in 2014/15 and having his debut at the Top 14 in 2015/16. The following season he moved to Stade Toulousain (2016/17). He moved afterwards to CA Brive, playing there from 2017/18 to 2018/19, the first season at the Top 14 and the second at the Pro D2. He returned to Section Paloise for two more seasons, from 2019/20 to 2020/21. He joined US Carcassonne for the season of 2021/22, at the Pro D2.

International career
He has 15 caps for Portugal, since his debut at the 32–25 win over Uruguay, at 11 November 2012, in Montevideo, in a tour, aged 23 years old. He has been a regular player for his national team in more recent years and has become one of the top scorers, with 1 try, 35 conversions and 25 penalties scored, 150 points on aggregate.

References

1988 births
Living people
French rugby union players
Portuguese rugby union players
Portugal international rugby union players
Section Paloise players
CA Brive players
Stade Toulousain players
US Carcassonne players
Rugby union scrum-halves